Galeria Olympia is an art gallery in Cracow, Poland established in 1999, that shows works by contemporary artists. Its name refers to the name of the founder, Olimpia Maciejewska, and to the title of a 1863 painting by Edouard Manet. The gallery is located in the Podgórze district, at Limanowskiego Street 24/4b.

Activity 
Galeria Olympia was established on 4 June 1999. It was located at Koletek Street until 2001, then it was moved several times. Since 2013 it runs at Limanowskiego Street 24/4b.

The gallery is run by Fred Gijbels Foundation. Each year it organises various solo exhibitions and at least one group exhibition focusing on a given issue. It held events that were part of Photo Month in Krakow and Conrad Festival (exhibition The Great Forties). Exhibitions previews were a regular contribution to Gadający Pies magazine.

Artists 
Artists shown at the gallery include:

 Bogusław Bachorczyk
 Ireneusz Bęc
 Ewa Ciepielewska
 Wojciech Ćwiertniewicz
 Edward Fella
 Raffaella Gentile
 Adam Golec
 Katarzyna Kmita
 Bogumił Książek
 Robert Motelski
 Andrzej Pilichowski-Ragno
 Adam Rzepecki
 Łódź Kaliska group
 Tomasz Vetulani
 Piotr Wachowski

References

External links 
 Galeria Olympia official website

Art museums and galleries in Poland
Culture in Kraków
1999 establishments in Poland